In music, Op. 60 stands for Opus number 60. Compositions that are assigned this number include:

 Beethoven – Symphony No. 4
 Brahms – Piano Quartet No. 3 in C minor
 Carcassi – 25 Studies for guitar
 Chopin – Barcarolle
 Dvořák – Symphony No. 6
 Elgar – The Torch and The River
 Foulds – A World Requiem
 Górecki – Totus Tuus
 Medtner – Piano Concerto No. 3
 Mendelssohn – Die erste Walpurgisnacht
 Saint-Saëns – Suite algérienne
 Schumann – Sechs Fugen über den Namen B-A-C-H
 Scriabin – Prometheus: The Poem of Fire
 Shostakovich – Symphony No. 7
 Strauss – Ariadne auf Naxos
 Strauss – Le bourgeois gentilhomme
 Szymanowski – Symphony No. 4